Springfield Line may refer to:

New Haven-Springfield Line, an intercity rail line in Connecticut and Massachusetts
Springfield Avenue Line (Newark), a former streetcar route in New Jersey
Springfield Route, a never-built Washington Metrorail line to Backlick Road, branching off the Blue Line at Van Dorn Street
Springfield railway line, Brisbane, a suburban railway line in Queensland, Australia